The 2006 Royal London Watches Grand Prix was a professional ranking snooker tournament that took place between 21 and 29 October 2006 at the A.E.C.C. in Aberdeen, Scotland.

John Higgins was the defending champion, however he lost 5-2 in the quarter-finals to Mark King. Neil Robertson won his first ranking title by defeating Jamie Cope 9–5 in the final. Earlier on Cope compiled a maximum break in his round robin win over Michael Holt.

Main draw

Round-robin stage

The first round used a round-robin format.  The top 32 and the 16 qualifiers were placed in eight groups of six with the top two from each group qualifying for the knockout stage.

Group 2A

21 October:
John Higgins 3-0 James Wattana
Alan McManus 3-0 Barry Hawkins
Issara Kachaiwong 3-2 Dominic Dale
Issara Kachaiwong 3-2 Barry Hawkins

22 October:
Alan McManus 3-1 Dominic Dale
John Higgins 3-1 Issara Kachaiwong
John Higgins 3-2 Dominic Dale
Issara Kachaiwong 3-1 Alan McManus

23 October:
Issara Kachaiwong 3-0 James Wattana
John Higgins 3-1 Barry Hawkins
James Wattana 1-3 Alan McManus

24 October:
John Higgins 1-3 Alan McManus 
Barry Hawkins 3-0 James Wattana
Barry Hawkins 3-0 Dominic Dale
James Wattana 0-3 Dominic Dale

Group 2B

21 October:
Ryan Day 3-0 Shaun Murphy
Mark King 3-1 Ali Carter
Ryan Day 3-0 Ali Carter
Shaun Murphy 3-0 Mark King

22 October:
Shaun Murphy 3-1 Michael Judge
Ryan Day 3-0 Jamie Jones
Ali Carter 3-0 Michael Judge

23 October:
Mark King 3-1 Michael Judge
Ali Carter 3-1 Jamie Jones
Jamie Jones 3-2 Mark King

24 October:
Michael Judge 2-3 Jamie Jones 
Ryan Day 0-3 Mark King 
Shaun Murphy 3-2 Jamie Jones
Shaun Murphy 2-3 Ali Carter 
Ryan Day 3-1 Michael Judge

Group 2C

21 October:
Michael Holt 3-0 Marco Fu
Ronnie O'Sullivan 3-1 Steve Davis
Michael Holt 3-1 David Roe
Steve Davis 3-1 Jamie Cope

22 October:
David Roe 3-1 Steve Davis
Ronnie O'Sullivan 3-0 Michael Holt
Jamie Cope 3-1 Marco Fu
Ronnie O'Sullivan 3-0 Jamie Cope
Marco Fu 3-1 David Roe

23 October:
Ronnie O'Sullivan 3-2 Marco Fu
Michael Holt 1-3 Jamie Cope 
Ronnie O'Sullivan 3-1 David Roe
Steve Davis 1-3 Michael Holt

24 October:
Steve Davis 3-0 Marco Fu
Jamie Cope 3-2 David Roe

Group 2D

21 October:
Nigel Bond 3-2 Neil Robertson
Judd Trump 3-2 Paul Davison
Neil Robertson 3-1 Joe Swail
Ken Doherty 3-2 Nigel Bond
Joe Swail 3-2 Judd Trump

22 October:
Ken Doherty 3-1 Paul Davison
Neil Robertson 3-1 Judd Trump
Joe Swail 3-2 Paul Davison
Ken Doherty 3-0 Judd Trump
Joe Swail 3-0 Nigel Bond

23 October:
Neil Robertson 3-2 Ken Doherty
Paul Davison 3-1 Nigel Bond
Ken Doherty 3-0 Joe Swail
Neil Robertson 3-0 Paul Davison
Nigel Bond 3-2 Judd Trump

Group 2E

21 October:
Liang Wenbo 3-1 Fergal O'Brien
Stephen Hendry 3-2 Mark Selby
Liang Wenbo 3-2 Andy Hicks

22 October:
Matthew Stevens 3-1 Liang Wenbo
Andy Hicks 3-2 Stephen Hendry
Mark Selby 3-0 Andy Hicks

23 October:
Matthew Stevens 3-0 Stephen Hendry
Fergal O'Brien 3-1 Andy Hicks
Mark Selby 3-0 Liang Wenbo
Matthew Stevens 3-1 Fergal O'Brien

24 October:
Fergal O'Brien 3-2 Stephen Hendry
Matthew Stevens 0-3 Mark Selby 
Stephen Hendry 0-3 Liang Wenbo 
Matthew Stevens 3-0 Andy Hicks
Mark Selby 0-3 Fergal O'Brien

Group 2F

21 October:
Stuart Bingham 3-0 Mark Williams
Robin Hull 3-1 Gerard Greene
Stephen Lee 3-2 Stuart Bingham

22 October:
Ian McCulloch 3-0 Stuart Bingham
Mark Williams 3-1 Stephen Lee
Ian McCulloch 3-0 Gerard Greene
Robin Hull 3-1 Mark Williams

23 October:
Ian McCulloch 3-2 Robin Hull
Gerard Greene 3-0 Stephen Lee
Mark Williams vs. Gerard Greene

24 October:
Robin Hull 3-0 Stuart Bingham
Stuart Bingham 2-3 Gerard Greene
Stephen Lee 3-1 Robin Hull
Stephen Lee 3-1 Ian McCulloch

Group 2G

21 October:
David Gray 3-2 Anthony Hamilton
David Gray 3-0 Ben Woollaston
Robert Milkins 3-2 Peter Ebdon

22 October:
Tom Ford 3-2 Anthony Hamilton
Ben Woollaston 3-1 Anthony Hamilton

23 October:
Robert Milkins 3-2 Tom Ford
Robert Milkins 3-1 Ben Woolaston
Peter Ebdon 1-3 David Gray 
Peter Ebdon 1-3 Tom Ford

24 October:
Peter Ebdon 3-0 Anthony Hamilton
Robert Milkins 3-1 David Gray
Ben Woolaston 3-2 Tom Ford
Peter Ebdon 3-2 Ben Woollaston
David Gray 3-0 Tom Ford
Anthony Hamilton 1-3 Robert Milkins

Group 2H

21 October:
Graeme Dott 3-2 Joe Perry Stephen
Maguire 3-0 Mark Allen
Ding Junhui 3-0 Graeme Dott
Andrew Norman 3-1 Mark Allen

22 October:
Andrew Norman 3-2 Ding Junhui
Graeme Dott 3-0 Mark Allen
Joe Perry 3-1 Stephen Maguire
Andrew Norman 3-2 Stephen Maguire

23 October:
Stephen Maguire 3-1 Graeme Dott
Joe Perry 3-0 Andrew Norman
Ding Junhui 2-3 Stephen Maguire 
Joe Perry 3-0 Mark Allen

24 October:
Graeme Dott 1-3 Andrew Norman 
Ding Junhui 3-2 Mark Allen
Joe Perry 3-0 Ding Junhui

Knockout stage

Final

Qualifying

Qualifying was held between 30 September and 4 October 2006 at Pontin's Prestatyn using a round-robin format. The entries were placed into eight groups with the top 2 from each group qualifying for the finals in Aberdeen.

Group 1A

30 September:
Ricky Walden 3-1 Marcus Campbell
Jimmy Michie 3-0 Joe Delaney
Matthew Couch 2-3 Tian Pengfei
Jamie Jones 2-3 Issara Kachaiwong
Ricky Walden 3-1 Jimmy Michie
Marcus Campbell 3-2 Joe Delaney
1 October
Matthew Couch 3-1 Jamie Jones
Tian Pengfei 0-3 Issara Kachaiwong
Ricky Walden 3-0 Joe Delaney
Marcus Campbell 2-3 Matthew Couch
Jimmy Michie 1-3 Jamie Jones
Ricky Walden 3-0 Issara Kachaiwong

2 October
Marcus Campbell 3-2 Tian Pengfei
Joe Delaney 1-3 Matthew Couch
Jimmy Michie 1-3 Issara Kachaiwong
Ricky Walden 2-3 Tian Pengfei
Marcus Campbell 2-3 Jamie Jones
Joe Delaney 1-3 Issara Kachaiwong
3 October
Tian Pengfei 0-3 Jamie Jones
Marcus Campbell 1-3 Jimmy Michie
Matthew Couch 0-3 Issara Kachaiwong
Jimmy Michie 3-0 Tian Pengfei
Joe Delaney 1-3 Jamie Jones
Ricky Walden 3-1 Matthew Couch

4 October
Marcus Campbell 2-3 Issara Kachaiwong
Joe Delaney 3-1 Tian Pengfei
Ricky Walden 1-3 Jamie Jones
Jimmy Michie 3-1 Matthew Couch

Group 1B

30 September:
Michael Judge 3-2 Dominic Dale
Shokat Ali 2-3 Jamie Burnett
Sean Storey 2-3 Andrew Higginson 
Roy Stolk 2-3 James Leadbetter 
Michael Judge 3-1 Shokat Ali
Dominic Dale 1-3 Jamie Burnett
1 October
Sean Storey 3-1 Roy Stolk
Andrew Higginson 3-2 James Leadbetter
Michael Judge 3-2 Jamie Burnett
Dominic Dale 3-0 Sean Storey
Shokat Ali 3-0 Roy Stolk
Michael Judge 1-3 James Leadbetter

2 October
Dominic Dale 2-3 Andrew Higginson 
Jamie Burnett 1-3 Sean Storey 
Shokat Ali 3-0 James Leadbetter
Michael Judge 3-2 Andrew Higginson
Dominic Dale 3-0 Roy Stolk
Jamie Burnett 1-3 James Leadbetter
3 October
Andrew Higginson 0-3 Roy Stolk 
Dominic Dale 3-2 Shokat Ali
Sean Storey 3 -2 James Leadbetter
Shokat Ali 3-1 Andrew Higginson
Jamie Burnett 3-1 Roy Stolk
Michael Judge 2-3 Sean Storey

4 October
Dominic Dale 3-1 James Leadbetter
Jamie Burnett 1-3 Andrew Higginson
Michael Judge 3-0 Roy Stolk
Shokat Ali 3-2 Sean Storey

Group 1C

30 September:
Rod Lawler 0-3 Jamie Cope 
Rory McLeod 2-3 Tony Drago 
Chris Melling 1-3 Paul Davison
Mark Boyle 3-2 Passakorn Suwannawat
Rod Lawler 1-3 Rory McLeod 
Jamie Cope 3-1 Tony Drago
1 October
Chris Melling 3-0 Mark Boyle
Paul Davison 2-3 Passakorn Suwannawat 
Rod Lawler 3-2 Tony Drago
Jamie Cope 3-1 Chris Melling
Rory McLeod 3-2 Mark Boyle
Rod Lawler 3-1 Passakorn Suwannawat

2 October
Jamie Cope 3-1 Paul Davison
Tony Drago 3-2 Chris Melling
Rory McLeod 3-0 Passakorn Suwannawat
Rod Lawler 3-1 Paul Davison
Jamie Cope 3-0 Mark Boyle
Tony Drago 3-2 Passakorn Suwannawat
3 October
Paul Davison 3-0 Mark Boyle
Jamie Cope 1-3 Rory McLeod 
Chris Melling 3-2 Passakorn Suwannawat
Rory McLeod 0-3 Paul Davison 
Tony Drago 3-1 Mark Boyle
Rod Lawler 2-3 Chris Melling

4 October
Jamie Cope 3-0 Passakorn Suwannawat
Tony Drago 1-3 Paul Davison 
Rod Lawler 2-3 Mark Boyle 
Rory McLeod 0-3 Chris Melling

Group 1D

30 September:
John Parrott 3-2 Drew Henry
David Gilbert 1-3 David Roe 
Judd Trump 3-0 Ian Preece
Dermot McGlinchey 3-2 Jeff Cundy
John Parrott 3-1 David Gilbert
Drew Henry 3-2 David Roe
1 October
Judd Trump 3-0 Dermot McGlinchey
Ian Preece 2-3 Jeff Cundy 
John Parrott 1-3 David Roe 
Drew Henry 1-3 Judd Trump 
David Gilbert 2-3 Dermot McGlinchey 
John Parrott 3-0 Jeff Cundy

2 October
Drew Henry 0-3 Ian Preece 
David Roe 1-3 Judd Trump 
David Gilbert 3-0 Jeff Cundy
John Parrott 2-3 Ian Preece 
Drew Henry 2-3 Dermot McGlinchey 
David Roe 3-0 Jeff Cundy
3 October
Ian Preece 3-0 Dermot McGlinchey
Drew Henry 0-3 David Gilbert 
Judd Trump 3-1 Jeff Cundy
David Gilbert 0-3 Ian Preece 
David Roe 3-1 Dermot McGlinchey
John Parrott 0-3 Judd Trump

4 October
Drew Henry 3-1 Jeff Cundy
David Roe 3-1 Ian Preece
John Parrott 3-1 Dermot McGlinchey
David Gilbert 3-1 Judd Trump

Group 1E

30 September:
Barry Pinches 1-3 Gerrard Greene 
Mike Dunn 2-3 Scott Mackenzie 
Paul Wykes 1-3 Liang Wenbo 
David Morris 3-0 Peter Lines
Barry Pinches 1-3 Mike Dun 
Gerard Greene 3-0 Scott Mackenzie
1 October
Paul Wykes 0-3 David Morris 
Liang Wenbo 3-0 Peter Lines
Barry Pinches 1-3 Scott Mackenzie 
Gerard Greene 1-3 Paul Wykes 
Mike Dunn 1-3 David Morris 
Barry Pinches 0-3 Peter Lines

2 October
Gerard Greene 1-3 Liang Wenbo 
Scott Mackenzie 1-3 Paul Wykes 
Mike Dunn 2-3 Peter Lines 
Barry Pinches 3-2 Liang Wenbo
Gerard Greene 3-1 David Morris
Scott Mackenzie 3-2 Peter Lines
3 October
Liang Wenbo 3-1 David Morris
Gerard Greene 3-1 Mike Dunn
Paul Wykes 0-3 Peter Lines 
Mike Dunn 0-3 Liang Wenbo 
Scott Mackenzie 1-3 David Morris 
Barry Pinches 3-2 Paul Wykes

4 October
Gerard Greene 3-2 Peter Lines
Scott Mackenzie 3-1 Liang Wenbo
Barry Pinches 3-0 David Morris
Mike Dunn 3-0 Paul Wykes

Group 1F

30 September:
Adrian Gunnell 0-3 Fergal O’Brien 
Robin Hull 3-0 Stuart Pettman
Chris Norbury 1-3 Liu Song 
Alex Borg 1-3 Mohammed Shehab 
Adrian Gunnell 3-2 Robin Hull
Fergal O’Brien 3-1 Stuart Pettman
1 October
Chris Norbury 3-1 Alex Borg
Liu Song 1-3 Mohammed Shehab 
Adrian Gunnell 3-0 Stuart Pettman
Fergal O’Brien 3-2 Chris Norbury
Robin Hull 3-1 Alex Borg
Adrian Gunnell 3-2 Mohammed Shehab

2 October
Fergal O’Brien 3-0 Liu Song
Stuart Pettman 0-3 Chris Norbury 
Robin Hull 3-1 Mohammed Shehab
Adrian Gunnell 3-2 Liu Song
Fergal O’Brien 3-0 Alex Borg
Stuart Pettman 2-3 Mohammed Shehab
3 October
Liu Song 0-3 Alex Borg 
Fergal O’Brien 2-3 Robin Hull 
Chris Norbury 3-1 Mohammed Shehab
Robin Hull 3-2 Liu Song
Stuart Pettman 3-0 Alex Borg
Adrian Gunnell 3-2 Chris Norbury

4 October
Fergal O’Brien 3-2 Mohammed Shehab
Stuart Pettman 3-2 Liu Song
Adrian Gunnell 2-3 Alex Borg 
Robin Hull 3-1 Chris Norbury

Group 1G

30 September:
Dave Harold 0-3 Mark Davis 
Paul Davies 1-3 Andrew Norman 
Mark Joyce 3-1 Lee Page
Robert Stephen 0-3 Ben Woollaston 
Dave Harold 3-1 Paul Davies
Mark Davis 1-3 Andrew Norman
1 October
Mark Joyce 0-3 Robert Stephen 
Lee Page 0-3 Ben Woollaston 
Dave Harold 0-3 Andrew Norman 
Mark Davis 3-1 Mark Joyce
Paul Davies 3-1 Robert Stephen
Dave Harold 2-3 Ben Woollaston

2 October
Mark Davies 3-2 Lee Page
Andrew Norman 1-3 Mark Joyce 
Paul Davies 2-3 Ben Woollaston 
Dave Harold 3-0 Lee Page
Mark Davis 3-0 Robert Stephen
Andrew Norman 1-3 Ben Woollaston
3 October
Lee Page 0-3 Robert Stephen 
Mark Davis 3-1 Paul Davies
Mark Joyce 2-3 Ben Woollaston 
Paul Davies 3-1 Lee Page
Andrew Norman 3-2 Robert Stephen
Dave Harold 3-1 Mark Joyce

4 October
Mark Davis 0-3 Ben Woollaston Andrew 
Norman 3-2 Lee Page
Dave Harold 3-0 Robert Stephen
Paul Davies 3-0 Mark Joyce

Group 1H

30 September:
Tom Ford 3-2 Jimmy White
Mark Allen 3-2 Joe Jogia
Alfie Burden 3-0 Lee Spick
Tom Ford 2-3 Mark Allen 
Jimmy White 1-3 Joe Jogia
1 October
Alfie Burden 2-3 Patrick Einsle 
Tom Ford 3-2 Joe Jogia
Jimmy White 3-0 Alfie Burden
Mark Allen 3-1 Patrick Einsle

2 October
Jimmy White 0-3 Lee Spick 
Joe Jogia 3-0 Alfie Burden
Tom Ford 3-0 Lee Spick
Jimmy White 3-2 Patrick Einsle
3 October
Lee Spick 3-0 Patrick Einsle
Jimmy White 3-1 Mark Allen
Mark Allen 3-1 Lee Spick
Joe Jogia 1-3 Patrick Einsle 
Tom Ford 0-3 Alfie Burden

4 October
Joe Jogia 0-3 Lee Spick
Tom Ford 3-2 Patrick Einsle Mark
Allen 2-3 Alfie Burden

Century breaks

Qualifying stage centuries

 141, 122, 100  Fergal O'Brien
 141  Marcus Campbell
 137, 120, 100  Jamie Cope
 137, 108  Ricky Walden
 135  Barry Pinches
 135  Chris Norbury
 134, 102  Paul Davison
 133  Andrew Norman
 133  Ben Woollaston
 132  Mohammed Shehab
 131, 106  Adrian Gunnell
 128  Jimmy Michie
 124  Dominic Dale
 122  Paul Davies
 120  Scott MacKenzie
 117  David Morris
 117  Mark Allen
 116, 101  Tom Ford

 115  Shokat Ali
 115  Jamie Burnett
 114, 104, 101  Gerard Greene
 114  Lee Page
 110  Joe Jogia
 109  Rory McLeod
 108  Chris Melling
 107, 106  Jamie Jones
 107  Lee Spick
 106  Mark Boyle
 106  Mike Dunn
 105  Jeff Cundy
 104  Jimmy White
 104  Mark Davis
 102  Stuart Pettman
 101  Passakorn Suwannawat
 101  Judd Trump
 100  Robin Hull

Televised stage centuries

 147, 105  Jamie Cope
 144  Robin Hull
 142, 131  Fergal O'Brien
 142  Issara Kachaiwong
 141  Stuart Bingham
 140  Ryan Day
 139, 107  Mark Selby
 136, 133, 129, 118, 113, 107, 104  Ronnie O'Sullivan
 128, 100  Ken Doherty
 126  David Roe
 123  Gerard Greene
 121, 120, 106, 106  John Higgins
 121  Tom Ford
 119, 102  Joe Perry

 116, 100  Neil Robertson
 112, 100  Stephen Maguire
 110, 102  Stephen Lee
 109, 104  Michael Judge
 107  Nigel Bond
 106, 104  Mark King
 105  Ding Junhui
 104, 101  Ian McCulloch
 104  Shaun Murphy
 103  Dominic Dale
 102  Ben Woollaston
 101, 100  Alan McManus
 101  Andrew Norman

Notes

References 

2006
Grand Prix
Grand Prix (snooker)
Snooker competitions in Scotland